Crassuncus pseudolaudatus is a moth of the family Pterophoridae. It is known from Madagascar.

References

Oidaematophorini
Moths of Madagascar
Moths of Africa
Moths described in 1992